John Bowyer may refer to:

Politicians
John Bowyer (MP for Penryn) or Bower, MP for Penrhyn, 1563
John Bowyer (MP for Derby), in 1383, MP for Derby
John Bowyer (fl. 1404), MP for Wells
John Bowyer (died 1605), MP for Newcastle-under-Lyme (UK Parliament constituency)
Sir John Bowyer, 1st Baronet (1623–1666), English soldier and MP for Staffordshire 1646, and Newcastle-under-Lyme
Sir John Bowyer, 2nd Baronet (1653–1691), English MP for Warwick and Staffordshire 1679–1685

Others
John Bowyer (cricketer) (1790–1880), English professional cricketer
John M. Bowyer (1853–1912), officer in the United States Navy

See also
John Bower (disambiguation)